Kempton Park railway station in Sunbury-on-Thames in Surrey is on the Shepperton branch line,  down the line from . The station and all trains serving it are operated by South Western Railway.  Access is from the front car park of Kempton Park Racecourse.

Until June 2006 it opened only for event days at Kempton Park Racecourse; since then, following the increase in racing days and after consultation with the Jockey Club, it has had stopping services every day.

Services 
The first service on Saturday and on Sunday is at 06:17 and 07:18 respectively. The Sunday service is one train an hour each way (and occasionally two).

None of the branch peak-hour services via Richmond stops at Kempton Park.

References

External links 

Railway stations in Surrey
Former London and South Western Railway stations
Railway stations in Great Britain opened in 1878
Railway stations served by South Western Railway
Kempton Park Racecourse
Sunbury-on-Thames